Tecmerium mnemosynella is a moth in the  family Blastobasidae. It is found in France.

References

Moths described in 1876
Blastobasidae
Moths of Europe